Jesús Rios (born 28 January 1964) is a Mexican former cyclist. He competed in the individual road race event at the 1984 Summer Olympics.

References

External links
 

1964 births
Living people
Mexican male cyclists
Olympic cyclists of Mexico
Cyclists at the 1984 Summer Olympics
Place of birth missing (living people)